Josine Desplanques (1478–1535) was an Augustinian nun and mystical poet from the Low Countries.

Life
Desplanques was born to a wealthy family in Tournai in 1478. She was orphaned by the age of ten and her guardians wasted her inheritance. She moved to Ghent to live with an uncle, and in 1506 entered the Augustinian convent of St Agnes. She was eventually elected prioress of the community. As superior she focused on improving the convent's finances and buildings. She died in Ghent in 1535.

Works
 Gheestelicke refreynen

References

1478 births
1535 deaths
Writers from Tournai
Augustinian nuns
Poets of the Habsburg Netherlands
16th-century women writers
Nuns of the Habsburg Netherlands